Tolman's rule states that, in a certain chemical reaction, the steps involve exclusively intermediates of 18- and 16 electron configuration.  The rule is an extension of the 18-electron rule.  This rule was proposed by American chemist Chadwick A. Tolman. As stated above, Tolman's rule, even for reactions that proceed via 2e− steps, is incorrect because many reactions involve configurations of fewer than 16 e−.

Many examples of homogeneous catalysis involving organometallic complexes involve shuttling of complexes between 16 and 18 electron configurations.  16-electron complexes often form adducts with Lewis bases and, if low-valent, undergo oxidative addition.

Conversely, complexes of 18 electron configuration tend to dissociate ligands or undergo reductive elimination:

See also

 Electron counting

References

Organometallic chemistry
Chemical bonding
Empirical laws
Eponyms